Stafford First United Methodist Church is a historic church in Stafford, Kansas. The building was designed by architect Don Buel Schuler (1888–1972). It was built in 1927 and was added to the National Register in 2002 as the First Methodist Episcopal Church.

References

External links

Historical information

Methodist churches in Kansas
Churches on the National Register of Historic Places in Kansas
Churches completed in 1927
Stafford County, Kansas
National Register of Historic Places in Stafford County, Kansas